Many religious communities have the term Sisters of Charity in their name.  Some Sisters of Charity communities refer to the  Vincentian tradition, or in America to the tradition of Saint Elizabeth Ann Seton, but others are unrelated. The rule of Vincent de Paul for the Daughters of Charity has been adopted and adapted by at least sixty founders of religious institutes for sisters around the world.

History

In 1633 Vincent de Paul, a French priest and Louise de Marillac, a widow, established the Company of the Daughters of Charity as a group of women dedicated to serving the "poorest of the poor". They set up soup kitchens, organized community hospitals, established schools and homes for orphaned children, offered job training, taught the young to read and write, and improved prison conditions. Louise de Marillac and Vincent de Paul both died in 1660, and by this time there were more than forty houses of the Daughters of Charity in France, and the sick poor were cared for in their own dwellings in twenty-six parishes in Paris. The French Revolution shut down all convents, but the society was restored in 1801 and eventually spread to Austria, Australia, Hungary, Ireland, Israel, Portugal, Turkey, Britain and the Americas.

In 1809 American Elizabeth Ann Seton, founded the Sisters of Charity of St. Joseph's, adapting the rule of the French Daughters of Charity for her Emmitsburg, Maryland, community.
  

In 1817, Mother Seton sent three Sisters to New York City to establish an orphanage. In 1829, four Sisters of Charity from Emmitsburg, Maryland, traveled to Cincinnati, to open St. Peter’s Girl’s Orphan Asylum and School. In 1850, the Sulpician priests of Baltimore successfully negotiated that the Emmitsburg community be united with the international community based in Paris. The foundations in New York and Cincinnati decided to become independent diocesan congregations. Six separate religious congregations trace their roots to the beginnings of the Sisters of Charity in Emmitsburg. In addition to the original community of Sisters at Emmitsburg (now part of the Vincentian order), they are based in New York City; Cincinnati, Ohio; Halifax, Nova Scotia; Convent Station, New Jersey; and Greensburg, Pennsylvania.

In 2011, the Daughters of Charity established The Province of St. Louise, bringing together the West Central, East Central, Southeast, and Northeast Provinces of the United States. Los Altos Hills in California remains a separate province. 

Sisters of Charity Federation in the Vincentian-Setonian Tradition:
Daughters of Charity of Saint Vincent de Paul
Sisters of Charity of New York
Sisters of Charity of Saint Elizabeth (Convent Station, New Jersey)
Sisters of Charity of the Immaculate Conception (Saint John, New Brunswick, Canada)
Les Religieuses de Notre-Dame-du-Sacré-Cœur, (Dieppe, New Brunswick)
Sisters of Charity of Saint Vincent de Paul (Halifax, Nova Scotia, Canada)
Sisters of Saint Martha (Antigonish, Nova Scotia, Canada)
Sisters of Charity of Cincinnati
Sisters of Charity of Seton Hill (Pennsylvania)
Sisters of Charity of Nazareth (Kentucky)
Vincentian Sisters of Charity (Pittsburgh, Pennsylvania); (merged 2008)
Sisters of Charity of Leavenworth (Kansas)
Sisters of Charity of Our Lady of Mercy (South Carolina)

Many other groups called Sisters of Charity have also founded and operate educational institutions, hospitals and orphanages:

Sisters of Charity of Australia
Sisters of Charity of the Blessed Virgin Mary
Sisters of Charity of Jesus and Mary
Sisters of Charity of Montreal (also known as Grey Nuns)
Sisters of Charity of Nevers

Sisters of Charity of St. Augustine
Sisters of Charity of the Incarnate Word
Sisters of Charity of Our Lady Mother of the Church
Sisters of Charity of Saints Bartolomea Capitanio and Vincenza Gerosa (SCCG)
Sisters of Charity of Our Lady Mother of Mercy (Netherlands)
Sisters of Divine Charity
St. Paul Sisters of Chartes, also known as the Sisters of Charity of St. Paul

Paris, France
The most famous convent is at 14 Rue du Bac in Paris, France, founded in 1633.  This was where Catholics believe Sister Catherine Labouré received the vision of Immaculate Mary on the eve of St. Vincent's feastday, 1830 and the dispensation of the Miraculous Medal.

Irish Sisters
Religious Sisters of Charity (or Irish Sisters of Charity), founded by Mary Aikenhead in 1815, were one of the orders involved in the controversial Magdalene Laundries in Ireland.

References

External links 
 Congregation Of The Sisters Of Charity, Heule in ODIS - Online Database for Intermediary Structures 

Catholic female orders and societies